Kosovo first participated at the European Games at the inaugural edition in 2015. They have a total of four medals, all in judo: one gold, one silver and two bronzes.

Medal tables

Medals by Games

Medals by sport

List of medallists

Flagbearers

See also
Kosovo at the Olympics
Kosovo at the Mediterranean Games
Sport in Kosovo

References

 
Kosovo at multi-sport events